Xanthorrhoea minor is a species of grasstree of the genus Xanthorrhoea native to south-eastern Australia. It was one of the many species authored by the Scottish botanist Robert Brown.

Unlike some other species of grasstree, it lacks a trunk, and its leaves grow from one or more underground stems. The leaves are green. It flowers from October to November.

Two subspecies are currently recognised:

X. minor subsp. lutea from South Australia and Victoria
X. minor subsp. minor from New South Wales, which grows in wet poorly drained areas such as swamps around the Sydney Basin, north to Gosford, and west to Springwood and south to Campbelltown.

References

Asparagales of Australia
minor
Flora of New South Wales
Flora of South Australia
Flora of Victoria (Australia)